Bal'ad District is one of the districts of Middle Shabelle region of Somalia. It is located about 36 kilometers northeast of the capital city of Mogadishu.

Terrorism 
In December 2021, Balad town was attacked by Al Shabaab fighters. About eight people were killed in the fighting.

On 9 June, 2022, Al-Shabaab claimed responsibility for a landmine explosion targeted at the Danab Brigade early in the morning on the outskirts of the town, which they claim killed at least 15 soldiers and destroyed one vehicle.

See also 
 Somali Civil War (2009–present)

References 

 at OpenStreetMap
 at ReliefWeb 
 at SWALIM

Populated places in Middle Shabelle